This is a list of by-elections in Hong Kong, with the names of the incumbent and victor and their respective parties.

Legislative Council by-elections
According to Legislative Council Ordinance, "a by-election to fill a vacancy occurring in the membership of the Legislative Council is not to be held within the 4 months preceding the end of that Council’s current term of office." However, there is no statutory requirement over when shall a by-election be held after a seat is declared vacant.

The following vacancies did not trigger by-election as they occurred –

 within 4 months before nomination period of general election: Ambrose Cheung in 1999, Au Nok-hin in 2019, Gary Fan in 2019, Ho Kai-ming in 2020
 during nomination period of general election: Paul Chan in 2012
 during public health emergency: Chan Hoi-yan, Raymond Chan, Eddie Chu, Tanya Chan, Alvin Yeung, Dennis Kwok, Kwok Ka-ki, Kenneth Leung, Ted Hui, Claudia Mo, Helena Wong, Wu Chi-wai, Andrew Wan, Lam Cheuk-ting, Roy Kwong, James To, Jeremy Tam, Charles Mok, Fernando Cheung, Leung Yiu-chung, Ip Kin-yuen, Joseph Lee, Shiu Ka-chun in 2020
 and the legal procedures prolonged into 4 months before nomination period of general election: Leung Kwok-hung in 2020.

SAR Legislative Council (1998 to present)

Provisional Legislative Council (1997–1998)

Colonial Legislative Council (1985–1997)

Urban Council by-elections

Regional Council by-elections

District Council by-elections

5th District Councils (2016 to 2019)

4th District Councils (2012–2015)

3rd District Councils (2008–2011)

2nd District Councils (2004–2007)

1st District Councils (2000–2003)

District Board by-elections

5th District Boards (1994–1997)

4th District Boards (1991–1994)

3rd District Boards (1988–1991)

2nd District Boards (1985–1988)

1st District Boards (1982–1985)

 
Hong Kong